Tahmasb Mazaheri is an Iranian politician who served as the Minister of Economic Affairs and Finance between 2001 and 2004, and then held office as the Governor of the Central Bank of Iran from 2007 to 2008.

Career
Mazaheri was appointed minister of finance to the cabinet of Mohammad Khatami in 2001. He replaced Hossein Namazi in the post. Mazaheri's term ended in April 2004 and he was succeeded by Safdar Hosseini.

Mazaheri was the governor of the Central Bank of Iran from September 2007 to September 2008.  He was the shortest serving governor of Central Bank since its establishment.

He was a candidate in the 2013 presidential election. His nomination was rejected.

Controversy
In January 2013, Mazaheri was interrogated at Düsseldorf Airport by German police due to not informing the authorities in advance that he carried a 300 million Venezuelan bolívar cheque (nearly $70 million).

It was later noted that the cheque belonged to an Iranian building company to cover its expenses while building public housing in Venezuela and Mazaheri was bringing the check for the company.

References

1953 births
Living people
Iranian economists
Iranian bankers
Finance ministers of Iran
Governors of the Central Bank of Iran